Novonikolayevka (also, Novomikhalovka) is a village in the Quba Rayon of Azerbaijan.  The village forms part of the municipality of Hacıhüseynli.

References

External links

Populated places in Quba District (Azerbaijan)